Bourgue is a French surname. Notable people with the surname include:

Mathias Bourgue (born 1994), French tennis player
Maurice Bourgue (born 1939), French oboist, composer, and conductor

French-language surnames